Rudi is a village in Soroca District, Moldova.

Notable people
 Vasile Săcară
 Nicolae Secară

Gallery

References

External links

Villages of Soroca District
Populated places on the Dniester
Tivertsi